Alex White is an English multi-instrumentalist who, along with brother Tom, forms the nucleus of Brighton band The Electric Soft Parade. Alex also plays drums in Brakes.

Discography
Electric Soft Parade
Holes in the Wall (2002)
The American Adventure (2003)
The Human Body EP (2005)
No Need to Be Downhearted (2007)
IDIOTS (2012)
Stages (2020)

References 

Living people
English rock drummers
Musicians from Brighton and Hove
The Pipettes members
The Electric Soft Parade members
Brakes (band) members
Year of birth missing (living people)